Maria João Brewster (née Sousa Leão; born 12 February 1955) is a Brazilian former model. She made a career as a photographic model in the 1970s and is the only Brazilian to date (until 2020) to appear on the cover of Sports Illustrated Swimsuit Issue, photographed in Bahia for the 1978 issue.

Biography 
Before embarking on her modeling career, João studied communication at the Pontifical Catholic University of Rio de Janeiro.

She began her career through her friend, photographer Pedro Liborio, who sent her photos to the advertising agency DPZ. They placed her on the market of advertising and fashion, starting with an ad to Johnson & Johnson. Among others, she photographed for famous Brazilian magazines like Claudia and Nova and worked with renowned photographers of the country as such as José Antonio and Luis Tripoli.

João is married to Alden Brewster, an American partner of Banco Icatu. She is the mother of actress Jordana Brewster, with whom she starred in an advertising campaign in the United States in 2015, and lives in New York City with her family.

References

External links
Swimsuit Issues at sicollection.com.

1955 births
Living people
People from Rio de Janeiro (city)
Brazilian female models
Brazilian expatriates in the United States
Pontifical Catholic University of Rio de Janeiro alumni